Julia Grinnell Storrow Cruger (pseudonym, Julien Gordon; c. 1850 – July 12, 1920) was an American novelist. Because many of her books examined the American social world, she was known as the Edith Wharton of her day.

Family
Julia Grinnell Storrow was born in Paris, France, c. 1850. She was the daughter of Thomas Wentworth Storrow of Boston and a grandniece of Washington Irving.

Career
She married Civil War veteran Col. Stephen Van Rensselaer Cruger, grandson of Stephen Van Rensselaer, who died in 1898, leaving her independently well off.  She married broker Wade Chance in 1908; they separated after a year and were divorced in 1916.  Cruger, who spoke French fluently, then moved to Paris for several years, returning to New York not long before her death.

In 1892, Cruger and her husband were included in Ward McAllister's "Four Hundred", purported to be an index of New York's best families, published in The New York Times. Conveniently, 400 was the number of people that could fit into Mrs. Astor's ballroom.

Her first book was A Diplomat's Diary (1890); it and the next three novels all appeared first in serial form. Many of her novels closely examined the social world of New York and Washington, D.C., and she was known as the Edith Wharton of her day.

Selected works
 A Diplomat's Diary (1890)
 Vampires: Mademoiselle Réséda (1891)
 A Successful Man (1891)
 A Puritan Pagan (1891)
 Marionettes (1892)
 His Letters (1892)
 Poppaea (1895)
 A Wedding and Other Stories (1896)
 Eat Not Thy Heart (1897)
 Mrs. Clyde: The Story of a Social Career (1901)
 The Wage of Character: A Social Study (1901)

References

External links
 

1920 deaths
1850s births
19th-century American novelists
19th-century American women writers
20th-century American novelists
American expatriates in France
French women writers
American women novelists
20th-century American women writers
People included in New York Society's Four Hundred
Wikipedia articles incorporating text from A Woman of the Century
Pseudonymous women writers
20th-century French women
19th-century pseudonymous writers
20th-century pseudonymous writers